The Big Black and the Blue is the first studio album by Swedish folk duo First Aid Kit. It was released on 25 January 2010 in the UK via Wichita Recordings, followed by a US release on 25 May 2010.

Reception

The Big Black and the Blue received a largely positive reception from music journalists. The album holds an aggregate score of 70/100 on Metacritic, indicating generally positive reviews.

NME awarded the album a score of 8/10, highlighting the band's "phenomenal way with gorgeous melodies and heart-melting harmonies", while Clash wrote that "the lyrics remain to stand out behind the relaxing tempo and give edge to their songs...which makes the whole experience magical". As with Drunken Trees, however, some critics offered more reserved praise: Drowned in Sound gave the album a score of 6/10, writing that "while there are tracks of beauty and wonder, there are duller moments too, where the history that First Aid Kit derive their music from overwhelms their songs, reminding us always of what came before.". The BBC, while praising the album as a whole, also expressed reservations, noting that "songs are, at times, little more than sketches...there’s only ever one element that’s properly illuminated: the vocals."

Singles
 "Ghost Town" (7" vinyl/digital, 27 September 2010)

Track listing
All tracks written by Klara and Johanna Söderberg.

Personnel
 Klara and Johanna Söderberg – production, vocals, instrumentation, mixing (tracks 1, 3–12), design and artwork
 Charlie Smoliansky – drums (tracks 1, 3, 5, 8, 10)
 Benkt Söderberg – mixing (tracks 1, 3–12)
 Johan Gustavsson – mixing (track 2)
 Erik Broheden – mastering (tracks 1–11)
 Henrik Jonsson – mastering (track 12)

Charts

References

2010 debut albums
First Aid Kit (band) albums